Arne Laurin (real name Arnošt Lustig; 1889 in Hrnčíře village, Praha-Šeberov, Prague – 17 February 1945 in New York City) was a Czech-Jewish journalist. He was editor of the Prager Presse and one of Karel Čapek's Friday Men circle.

He is buried at the New Jewish Cemetery in Prague.

References

Czech journalists
Czech Jews
1889 births
1945 deaths
20th-century journalists
Czechoslovak emigrants to the United States